Rumelange railway station is a railway station serving Rumelange, in south-western Luxembourg.  It is operated by Chemins de Fer Luxembourgeois, the state-owned railway company.

The station is situated on Line 60, which connects Luxembourg City to the Red Lands of the south of the country.  Rumelange is the terminus of a branch line that separates from the main line at Noertzange.

External links
 Official CFL page on Rumelange station 
 Rail.lu page on Rumelange station

Railway station
Railway stations in Luxembourg
Railway stations on CFL Line 60